The Beast Within is a 1982 horror film directed by Philippe Mora.

The Beast Within may also refer to:

The Beast Within (novel), a 1981 novel by Edward Levy; basis for the film
"The Beast Within" (song), a remix of the 1990 Madonna song "Justify My Love"
"The Beast Within" (The Little Mermaid), a 1994 TV episode
"The Beast Within" (Teen Titans), a 2004 TV episode
The Beast Within: A Gabriel Knight Mystery, a 1995 computer adventure game
Beast Within, a 2008 album by Katra
La Bête Humaine or The Beast Within, an 1890 novel by Émile Zola
Virus Undead or Beast Within, a 2008 German horror film